Giovanni Felice Sances (also Sancies, Sanci, Sanes, Sanchez, ca. 160024 November 1679) was an Italian singer and a Baroque composer. He was renowned in Europe during his time.

Sances studied at the Collegio Germanico in Rome from 1609 to 1614. He appeared in the opera Amor pudico in Rome in 1614. His career then took him to Bologna and Venice. His first opera Ermiona was staged in Padua in 1636, in which he also sang.

In 1636 he moved to Vienna, where he was initially employed at the imperial court chapel as a tenor. In 1649, during the reign of Ferdinand III he was appointed vice-Kapellmeister under Antonio Bertali. He collaborated with Bertali to stage regular performances of Italian opera. He also composed sepolcri, sacred works and chamber music.

In 1669 he succeeded to the post of Imperial Kapellmeister upon Bertali's death. From 1673, due to poor health, many of his duties were undertaken by his deputy Johann Heinrich Schmelzer. He died in Vienna in 1679.

Works

Sacred works

Published motet collections
Motetti a una, due, tre, e quattro voci (1638)
Motetti a 2, 3, 4, a cinque voci con Litania della BVM (1642) dedicated to Guglielmo Slavata chancellor
Salmi a 8 voci (1643) dedicated to Archduke Leopold Wilhelm
Salmi brevi a 4 v. concertate (1647, Cardano) dedicated to Ferdinand IV, King of the Romans
Antiphonae sacrae una voce decantandae (1648, Cardano) dedicated to Antonio Spindler abbot of the Schottenkirche
 Motetti a quattro voci ; Venice, 1658

Various works
60 Mass settings including
 Missa Sanctae Maria Magdalenae (for 6 wind instruments, 6 string instruments, 7 voices, and organ)
Missa Solicita
 Stabat Mater or Il pianto della Madonna (1638)
 O Domine Jesu
 O Deus Meus
 O Maria Dei genitrix
 Caro Mea
 Improperium expectavit cor meum
 Vulnerasti cor meum
 Domine quid multiplicati sunt
 Plagae tuae Domine
 Iste confessor

Secular works
Six operas, of which three lost
 Opera: L’Ermiona (1636) - lost - libretto by Pio Enea degli Obizzi (1592–1674) on the story of Cadmus and Hermione, performed as an introduction to a tournament.
 Oratorios: Lachrime di San Pietro (1666) La morte de bellata (1669), Sette consolazioni a Maria Vergine per la morte di Cristo (1670), Il trionfo della Croce (1671), Il Paradiso aperto per la morte di Cristo (1672), L' ingiustitia della sentenza di Pilato (1676)

Published secular music
Cantatas book I - lost (date unknown)
Cantatas for one voice (Venice 1633)
Cantatas for two voices (Venice 1633)
Il Quarto Libro, cantatas for one voice, with two duets and one for three voices. (Venice 1636)
Capricci Poetici, 23 works (Venice 1649)
Trattenimenti musicali per camera, (Venice, 1657), 16 works

Various
 Mi fai peccato (for 2 voices & basso continuo)
 Si fera s'uccida, (for 2 voices, strings & basso continuo)
 Misera, hor si ch'il pianto
 Chi sa amare e tracer mercede aspetti (canzonetta for 2 voices)
 Presso l'onde tranquille (for voice & basso continuo)
 Traditorella che credi (for voice & basso continuo)
 Perché Vechia gli dissi (for voice & basso continuo)
 Che sperasti ò mio cor (for voice & basso continuo)
 Cantata: Lagrimosa beltà (ciaccona) (for 2 voices)
 Cantata: Non sia chi mi riprende (1636)
Dialogo a due. Pastor e Ninfa (1649)

References
 Il quarto libro delle cantate et arie a voce sola, Venetia, Vincetini, 1636
 Capricci poetici di Gioan Felice Sances, Venetia, Gardano, 1649
 Carter, Stewart, "Trombone Obbligatos in Viennese Oratorios of the Baroque", Historic Brass Society Journal, p55, July 1, 1990.
 Sadie, Julie Anne, ed., "Companion to Baroque Music", University of California Press, 1998. . Pages 257–8
 Weaver, Andrew H., "Music in the Service of Counter-Reformation Politics: The Immaculate Conception at the Habsburg Court of Ferdinand III (1637–1657)", Oxford University Press, 2006.

Specific

Recordings
 Tirsi Morir Volea, Sacro & Profano, Marco Mencoboni E lucevan le stelle records 
Dulcis amor Iesu. Scherzi Musicali with Nicolas Achten, conductor. 2010, Ricercar RIC 292
''Stabat Mater & Motets to the virgin Mary - Philippe Jaroussky - Warner Classics - Aout 2009

External links
 
 
 

1600s births
1679 deaths
Year of birth uncertain
Italian Baroque composers
Italian Baroque
Italian male classical composers
Italian opera composers
Male opera composers
17th-century Italian composers
17th-century male musicians